Myosotis ramosissima or early forget-me-not is a flowering plant species in the family Boraginaceae. Its habitats include prairies, roadsides, and grassy embankments.

References

External links

ramosissima
Flora of Lebanon